Clarissa is a 1991 British period drama television miniseries starring Sean Bean, Saskia Wickham and Lynsey Baxter. It aired on the BBC in three episodes between 27 November and 11 December 1991. It was based on the novel Clarissa published in 1747-48 by Samuel Richardson. It follows a virtuous young woman who is oppressed by her ambitious family and a rake who becomes obsessed with her.

Plot
The virtuous Clarissa (Wickham) inherits a fortune from her grandfather but gives it into the control of her jealous family. Clarissa is the image of a youthful, virtuous young woman. Lovelace (Bean) arrives to seduce Clarissa's sister Arabella (Baxter) and the two go out for a walk. Clarissa is also in the gardens and comes across the two in embrace. Lovelace catches sight of Clarissa and is immediately enchanted by her, which Arabella notices and becomes disgusted. From that point onwards, Lovelace attempts to see Clarissa again even as her family tightens their grip of control on her and bans her from seeing Lovelace. This control is primarily backed by her devious sister Arabella and brother James (Phillips), both of whom plot to foil any chances at happiness for Clarissa. Eventually the family decides that Clarissa will marry the wealthy Mr. Solmes (Firth). In an attempt to force her hand in this marriage, the family bans Clarissa from writing or sending letters and removes Clarissa's dear friend Anna Howe (Norris) from the household, also replacing a maid who informs James about Clarissa's every move. Clarissa repeatedly tries to reach her family, including having her new handmaid deliver letters to her uncle, father, and mother. All three of whom she used to be close to, the handmaid returns with all three letters having been ripped up and unread. Her brother and sister also physically incapacitate Clarissa and force the realization of a dull future with Mr. Solmes onto her.

Realizing the severity of her situation and feeling isolated, Clarissa feels forced to seek the protection of Lovelace and his family. Clarissa delivers a letter to Lovelace through a loose brick in the henhouse. Clarissa dreams that night of her wedding, all in white, with her family in attendance. Lovelace appears and draws his sword on her family in threat before turning it towards Clarissa and fatally stabbing her through the heart. Lovelace acts genuine towards Clarissa but is actually a rake who wants to seduce her. Clarissa leaves on the night of her letter to meet Lovelace and ends up, reluctantly, going with him to an inn. The two sleep in separate rooms but Lovelace blatantly hints at his true intentions. They bicker the next day and Clarissa continues to hold on to her virtue and deny Lovelace his affections. Lovelace continues to press her, but changes tactics to beg Clarissa for help in becoming a better man himself. He approaches Clarissa with the Bible and informs her that he is practicing reformation. She agrees to assist him in his repentance but wonders what Lovelace's true intentions are.

He lodges her with a madam and her prostitutes. Her reputation ruined, she tries to run away, but is tricked into coming back, ostensibly to marry him and restore her reputation. As the whores hold her down, Lovelace rapes her. He insists he wants to marry her, but she wants no part of him and escapes. Distraught, Clarissa starves herself to death. Lovelace's family reject him and his erstwhile friend kills him for ruining her.

References

External links
 
 Radio Times listing on BBC Genome

BBC television dramas
1991 British television series debuts
1991 British television series endings
1990s British drama television series
Period television series
1990s British television miniseries
English-language television shows
Television shows set in England